Peroz II Kushanshah (Bactrian script: Πιρωςο Κοϸανο ϸαηο) was the penultimate Kushanshah of the Kushano-Sasanian Kingdom from 303 to 330. He was the successor of Hormizd II Kushanshah.

Like his two previous predecessors—Hormizd I Kushanshah and Hormizd II Kushanshah—Peroz II had the same group of coins minted during his reign, with gold dinars and copper drachms provided from the main Kushano-Sasanian base of Tukharistan. However, Peroz II is called "the Great Kushan King" and not the "Kushan King of Kings" on his coins, hence renouncing their claim of kingship over the Sasanian Empire. Since the reign of Hormizd I Kushanshah, copper drachms were minted with the names of two local governors, Meze and Kavad. This was also continued under Peroz II. 

In Gandhara, Peroz II issued copper coins with his characteristic "bull horns crown". However, he was the last of the Kushano-Sasanian rulers to issue such coins in Gandhara. After that point, the area was occupied by Shapur II, who issued his own coinage from Kabul.

Peroz II was succeeded by Varahran Kushanshah in Tukharistan, while the Sasanian King of Kings Shapur II incorporated Gandhara and Kabul into his own domains.

References

Sources 
  
  
  
 
 
 
  
 

Kushanshahs
4th-century monarchs in Asia
4th-century Iranian people
Monarchs of the Kushano-Sasanian Kingdom